Singles: Flirt Up Your Life is a video game developed by German studio Rotobee and published by Deep Silver in 2003.

It was very similar to The Sims in that the player is responsible for characters who have to be taken care of, such as by ordering them to eat, sleep, go to work, etc.

The game was available for sale via download from the company's website, with payment required to continue playing after the one-hour time limit expired.

The CD-ROM version sold in the US censored any nudity throughout the game.

Reception

Singles was largely panned by critics for being a rip-off of The Sims and the way it offered little challenge, with the player required to simply follow a routine of making the characters progress from making small talk through to professing love then running off to bed together via the simple interaction menus.

Sequel
A sequel, titled Singles 2: Triple Trouble, was released in June 2005 and featured three housemates instead of two.

References

External links

2003 video games
Deep Silver games
Lua (programming language)-scripted video games
Romance video games
Social simulation video games
Embracer Group franchises
Video games developed in Germany
Windows games
Windows-only games
Zoo Corporation games